Lebong is a valley about  below Darjeeling town, West Bengal, India. It is about 8 km from the Mall, the central location of Darjeeling. The valley is noted for its race course. The Lebong race course is visible from the town of Darjeeling. Lebong is also the place where initial tea plantation of the Darjeeling hills started in the 1850s. It is also famous for Gorkha stadium located there. Other places of importance in Lebong are Golai Bazaar, Lebong Cricket Bazaar. Lebong Valley has Tea Gardens like Ging, Badamtam, Phoobshering. 

Darjeeling
Valleys of India
Villages in Darjeeling district